WOUB-TV (channel 20) is a PBS member television station in Athens, Ohio, United States. The station's transmitter is located west of the city off SR 56. Its programming can also be seen on satellite station WOUC-TV (channel 44) in Cambridge, with transmitter near Fairview, Ohio.

The WOUB/WOUC studios and offices are located in the Radio-TV building on the Athens campus of Ohio University, which owns the stations' licenses through the WOUB Center for Public Media. The Center is a non-academic unit of the Scripps College of Communication. The two stations, combined, serve southeastern Ohio and portions of neighboring West Virginia and Kentucky. The public media center also serves as a laboratory for Ohio University students who are interested in gaining experience in broadcasting and related technologies. In addition to radio (WOUB AM and FM) and television, WOUB is also active in online services and media production.

Unlike most PBS stations, the channel produces a regular local newscast by university students studying and training on television newscasts at Ohio University. With that, they mainly focus on the area around Athens, which is mostly ignored by the Columbus, Zanesville and Huntington–Charleston stations that serve the Athens area.

Coverage area
Athens and surrounding Athens County are located in the fringes of the Columbus market.  However, the combined power of the two stations reaches most of the Huntington–Charleston and Zanesville markets, as well as portions of the Columbus, Parkersburg and Wheeling–Steubenville markets. The station leases commercial fiber line to permit it to be carried on the Columbus local feeds of the DBS providers.

Technical information
As of April 11, 2018, when they expanded to six broadcast streams per transmitter, WOUB-TV and WOUC-TV share the same programming.

Subchannels
The stations' digital signals are multiplexed:

Analog-to-digital conversion
In 2009, when the analog to digital conversion was completed, WOUB-TV and WOUC-TV used channels 27 and 35, respectively for digital television operations.  Following the transition the stations remained on those channels, but, it uses PSIP to display 20 and 44 as the stations' respective virtual channels. In 2019, both stations moved to new physical channels as part of the FCC's spectrum re-pack process.

Images

References

External links
Official website

PBS member stations
Ohio University
Television channels and stations established in 1963
Television stations in Ohio